Trevor Hildenberger, nicknamed Hildy (born December 15, 1990) is an American professional baseball pitcher in the San Francisco Giants organization. He was drafted in the 22nd round of the 2014 Major League Baseball Draft. He made his MLB debut in 2017.  He has played in Major League Baseball (MLB) for the Minnesota Twins and New York Mets.

Career
Hildenberger attended Archbishop Mitty High School in San Jose, California. He then played college baseball at the University of California, Berkeley. As a senior, his 10 saves tied the school’s single-season record, and he was 3-3 with a 2.83 ERA and 48 strikeouts in 47.2 innings.

Minnesota Twins
He was drafted by the Minnesota Twins in the 22nd round of the 2014 Major League Baseball Draft, and signed. He made his professional debut with the Gulf Coast Twins that same year, before being promoted to the Elizabethton Twins. In 29 relief innings pitched between the two teams he compiled a 1–4 record and 2.48 ERA. He was named a GCL post-season All Star. 

He started 2015 with the Cedar Rapids Kernels, and was eventually called up to the Fort Myers Miracle. In 41 appearances out of the bullpen between Cedar Rapids and Fort Myers, he was 3–2 with a 1.55 ERA and an 0.72 WHIP. He also played in the Arizona Fall League after the 2015 season. 

Hildenberger spent 2016 with Fort Myers and the Chattanooga Lookouts. He compiled a 3–4 record, a 0.75 ERA, and a 0.79 WHIP in 38 relief appearances.

Hildenberger's 2017 began with the Rochester Red Wings, and on June 23 the Twins purchased his contract from Rochester, with Hildenberger making his MLB debut the same day. In 21 appearances for the Red Wings prior to his call-up he was 2–1 with a 2.05 ERA. In his debut against the Cleveland Indians, Hildenberger allowed a hit and struck out one in his lone inning of work. He spent the remainder of 2017 with the Twins, going 3–3 with a 3.21 ERA with 44 strikeouts in 42 innings. 

He began the 2018 season with the Twins, collecting 7 saves in 73 appearances. In 2019, he excelled during the first month of the season before struggling the following month, leading to his demotion to AAA.

On December 2, 2019, Hildenberger was non-tendered by Minnesota and became a free agent.

Boston Red Sox
On January 11, 2020, Hildenberger signed a minor league deal with the Boston Red Sox that included an invitation to spring training. He became a free agent on November 2, 2020.

New York Mets
On December 8, 2020, Hildenberger signed a minor league contract with the New York Mets organization. He was selected to the Mets' roster on April 8, 2021, replacing the injured Dellin Betances. After allowing four earned runs in 2.1 innings, Hildenberger was designated for assignment on May 15, 2021.

San Francisco Giants
On May 18, 2021, Hildenberger was claimed off waivers by the San Francisco Giants and assigned to the Triple-A Sacramento River Cats. On May 21, Hildenberger was designated for assignment by the Giants. He was outrighted to the Triple-A Sacramento River Cats on May 26.
Hildenberger became a free agent following the season, but re-signed on December 1.

References

External links

California Golden Bears bio

1990 births
Living people
Baseball players from San Jose, California
Major League Baseball pitchers
Minnesota Twins players
New York Mets players
California Golden Bears baseball players
Gulf Coast Twins players
Elizabethton Twins players
Cedar Rapids Kernels players
Fort Myers Miracle players
Scottsdale Scorpions players
Chattanooga Lookouts players
Rochester Red Wings players
Sacramento River Cats players
Syracuse Mets players